The Williamsburgh Savings Bank Tower, also known as One Hanson Place, is a skyscraper in the Fort Greene neighborhood of Brooklyn in New York City. Located at the northeast corner of Ashland Place and Hanson Place near Downtown Brooklyn, the tower is one of Brooklyn's architectural icons. The tower was designed by Halsey, McCormack and Helmer and constructed from 1927 to 1929 as the new headquarters for the Williamsburgh Savings Bank.

The building's main entrance is through a large arch on Hanson Place. At ground level, the tower is clad with limestone above a granite dado; three arched windows on Ashland Place overlook the banking room. Above the sixth story, the building is faced in brick with terracotta decoration. Inside is an entrance vestibule and lobby with ornately decorated marble and metalwork. There is also a lobby in the basement, leading to Atlantic Terminal and the Atlantic Avenue–Barclays Center station, and a mezzanine-level ladies' lounge, overlooking the banking room. 

In the 19th century, the Williamsburgh Savings Bank occupied three separate headquarters in Williamsburg, Brooklyn. The bank's officers decided to construct a skyscraper near Downtown Brooklyn for its new headquarters in the mid-1920s. The bank occupied the lowest floors when the building opened on April 1, 1929. The remaining stories were rented as offices. By the late 20th century, much of the building contained dentists' offices. The New York City Landmarks Preservation Commission designated the tower's exterior as a city landmark in 1977 and similarly designated the interiors of the lobby and banking spaces in 1996. The Williamsburgh Savings Bank became part of HSBC Bank USA through several mergers, and HSBC sold the building in 2004. The building's upper stories were converted to luxury condominium apartments from 2005 to 2007, while the banking hall became an event space.

Site

The Williamsburgh Savings Bank Tower is at 1 Hanson Place, at the northeast corner with Ashland Place, in the Fort Greene neighborhood of the borough of Brooklyn in New York City. It occupies the southwestern section of a rectangular city block bounded by Ashland Place to the west, Hanson Place to the south, St. Felix Street to the east, and Lafayette Avenue to the north.

Many of the surrounding buildings are row houses designed in the Italianate style. The Hanson Place Central United Methodist Church is on the same block to the east, and the Brooklyn Academy of Music is just to the north. The site is also near the Atlantic Terminal mall, the Atlantic Terminal station of the Long Island Rail Road (LIRR), and the Barclays Center arena.

The site is near the historic split of Jamaica Road (now Atlantic Avenue) and the Flatbush Turnpike (now Flatbush Avenue). It overlooks Times Plaza, the intersection of Flatbush, Atlantic, and Fourth Avenues in Downtown Brooklyn. This site had grown into a commercial center by the early 20th century. Prior to the tower's construction, there were eight buildings on the lot. A small part of the site was previously owned by the Hanson Place Central United Methodist Church. Despite its location near the subway and LIRR terminal, the site had not attracted any major business before the tower was built, likely in part because of the proximity of the Fort Greene Meat Market.

Architecture
The tower was designed by the architectural firm Halsey, McCormack and Helmer (now Mancini Duffy). The building was constructed from 1927 to 1929 in a modernized Byzantine-Romanesque style. It was named for its original client, the Williamsburgh Savings Bank, which in turn is named for its original headquarters in Williamsburg. Chief architect Robert Helmer wrote at the time of the building's opening that he wanted it "to be regarded as a cathedral dedicated to the furtherance of thrift and prosperity."

The New York City Department of City Planning cites One Hanson Place as containing 41 stories, while Emporis.com and The Skyscraper Center give a figure of 42 stories. Due to the height of the five-story banking room, as well as empty spaces on the topmost floors, the building has been described as having as few as 34 stories. However, the building was not the borough's tallest structure for most of its history; that record was held by a  transmitter built atop the nearby Brooklyn Technical High School in 1938. The tower remained the tallest building on Long Island until 1989, with the completion of One Court Square in Queens, and the tallest building in Brooklyn until 2009, with the topping-out of the Brooklyner.

Form and facade 
There are about 935 windows on the facade. One Hanson Place occupies its full site at ground level. Its upper stories contain a balanced, though not symmetrical, vertical massing of staggered setbacks in brick and architectural terracotta. These setbacks are included to comply with the 1916 Zoning Resolution.  For most of the 20th century, the Williamsburgh Savings Bank Tower was the only high-rise in the surrounding area. This, along with the fact that the building was near the intersection of five streets, often resulted in the intensification of wind gusts around the building.

Base 

On the lower stories, One Hanson Place's elevations are designed symmetrically around the axes of the ground-story banking room. At ground level is a highly polished dado veneered with veined and colored Minnesota granite. Near the corner is an inscription in all capital letters:

To Our Depositors Past and Present This Building Is Dedicated. By Their Industry and Thrift They Have Built Homes and Educated Children, Opened the Door of Opportunity to Youth and Made Age Comfortable Independent and Dignified. By Those Sturdy Virtues They Have Obtained Their Ambitions, Swept Aside the Petty Distinctions of Class and Birth and So Maintained the True Spirit of American Democracy.

Above the dado, the first six stories of One Hanson Place are clad with limestone and contain arched windows into the banking room. Embedded in the wall are square bas-reliefs, one on the right of a burglar, whom the depositor understood would be thwarted by the massive vault doors in the basement. The center of the Hanson Place elevation has a large arch similar to those on Ashland Place. The space beneath the Hanson Place arch contains three round-arched doorways, separated by round columns.

The frames of the large windows are ornately decorated. Each of the primary vertical mullions are half-round columns; the capitals above these mullions depict bucrania and pelicans. The windows contain tinted cast-glass panes made by the Thomas Jones Decorative Glass Company. Other carved details represent values of thrift. These include beehives; squirrels that store nuts; the head of Mercury, god of commerce; wise owls; and seated lions whose paws protect the bank's lockbox, with the bank's monogram on the lock haft. The four continents are also represented in the windows' carved frames. The windows' ornate decorations contrasted with the spare ornamentation of the piers on which the arches rested.

At the physical sixth story (labeled as floor 2), above the large arches, are smaller round-arched windows separated by polished-granite columns. A band of corbels runs above this story, delineating the transition to the upper section of the tower.

Upper stories 
Above the sixth story, each elevation of the building's facade is articulated by vertical piers that rise ten stories. The seventh through 16th stories of the building (floors 3 through 12) are divided into ten bays along Ashland Place and five bays along Hanson Place. Each bay contains two windows per story; the center six bays on Ashland Place are recessed. The 17th story (floor 13) contains round-arched windows, above which is a horizontal band of terracotta and a setback. Above this story, the massing of One Hanson Place rises in an asymmetrical cruciform shape. Contrasting limestone trim is used to distinguish each setback.

At the 30th story (floor 26) is an open loggia of arched windows, topped by another horizontal band of terracotta. The roof contains an abandoned public observation deck at the 30th-story setback. Visitors could only access the deck by obtaining a card from the building's security guards, which had to be returned when the visitor departed. As late as the 1970s, the observation deck was open to the public during the middle of the day on weekdays, and visitors did not need to pay admission. The observation deck was closed in the late 1970s. Despite the building's prominence, bank officials in 1989 could not recall anyone having ever jumped to their death from the observatory.

Above the 30th story, One Hanson Place's massing shrinks to a square tower with large clock faces on each side. Corresponding to the 34th through 36th stories (floors 30–32), the clock faces originally contained bright red neon tubes. When the clock was first illuminated in 1928, the Brooklyn Daily Eagle claimed the clock faces could be seen from thirty miles away. At the time of the building's construction, the clock was the largest in New York City and among the largest in the world. The hour hands each weigh  and the minute hands weigh . There are dots in place of numerals. Twelve lamps illuminate each clock face at night. During the mid-20th century, many of the borough's residents set their wristwatches to the clock.

The building is topped by an octagonal drum, which supports the dome above it. One Hanson Place's Renaissance-style dome was inspired by that atop the bank's previous headquarters at 175 Broadway, which had been designed by George B. Post. The architects' original plans did not include the dome. However, bank officials required the dome to be included; as Helmer noted: "Dome was required by Bank over our dead protests". The dome was illuminated at night by red, amber, and green lights. At the time of the building's opening, these lights faded into each other, running a full cycle every four minutes. To accommodate the lighting system, the dome was made of movable louvers.

Interior 
The most ornate part of the interior was the banking space, with a five-story-tall banking room running parallel to Ashland Place. To the south is the building's lobby and the Hanson Place entrance vestibule. The main lobby, extending the width of the Hanson Place frontage, is divided by segmental arches into eleven bays: three to the west, three to the center, and five to the east. Above the lobby was a mezzanine with a ladies' lounge, overlooking the banking room.

The building has a steel superstructure, though this is concealed on the lower stories by cast stonework. The superstructure is arranged around the columns in the banking room; the use of a portal frame enabled the construction of the office stories above. Rene Paul Chambellan created much of the sculptural work for the bank's interior. Masonry and metalwork are used extensively in the bank's interior. The metal included brass, bronze, copper, silver, and both cast and wrought steel. Also present are 22 types of marble, ranging from red to green to purple. Barely any wood was used except for flagpoles in the banking room. The ceilings are made of plaster with mosaic finishes. Within the banking room and its ladies' lounge, mosaics and huge tinted windows contain silhouetted iron cutouts with vignettes of figures such as workers and students. Cox, Nostrand & Gunnison manufactured the banking interiors' lighting fixtures.

Lobby 

On the south side of the ground story, leading from the center of the Hanson Place frontage, is an entrance vestibule. The doors from the south lead from Hanson Place. Three sets of doors lead north from the entrance vestibule to the middle of the main lobby. The central set is a revolving door added after the building's completion, while the flanking doors are part of the original design. Above both sets of doors are metal panels, each depicting an arcade of seven ornately decorated arches. In addition, the west and east walls contain metal grilles with floral decorations.

The entrance vestibule connects with the central section of the lobby, which comprises the fourth through sixth bays from west. The lobby floor is made of marble. The center of the floor is elaborately decorated with Cosmati-style motifs. Above the south doors are metal panels depicting arcades, similar to those in the vestibule. To the north, three double metal doors lead to the banking room. Carved figures on these doors represent six types of tradesmen who might open accounts at the bank. The floral decorations on the doors represent the months of the year.

The westernmost three bays lead to the safe-deposit area in the basement. The easternmost five bays lead to the elevators, as well as a staircase down to the basement lobby and up to the former ladies' lounge. The walls are made of marble. The ceiling's segmental arches divide the ceiling into 11 saucer vaults. Each vault has tesserae mosaics that vary from gray-blue to intense turquoise and ultramarine. These mosaic tiles, forming the background color of each vault, represent the sky. Gold stars are overlaid onto the sky. Globe-shaped lighting fixtures are placed in alternating vaults.

The eastern section of the lobby contains five elevators, whose doors originally contained representations of four seasons, four types of arts, and four classical elements. Also placed on the doors were depictions of several skilled workers. The decorative elevator doors have since been replaced with plain anodized metal doors. Atop the directory are a winged hourglass and an analog clock, flanked by four gilded figures. The stairways up to the ladies' lounge and down to the basement lobby contain marble walls.

Banking room 

The banking room is placed asymmetrically in relation to the ground-story footprint. The wider dimension is parallel to Ashland Place and, except for a service alley to the north, is centered on the Ashland Place windows.

The interior layout was patterned after that of a church. The room's central nave, for clients and bank officers, was flanked to the east and west by aisles with tellers' desks. At the north end of the banking room, officers worked in a chancel separated from the rest of the space by a low parapet. At the southwestern corner of the banking room, another low parapet delineated the new-accounts area, which had a fireplace. The former mezzanine-level ladies' lounge is above the lobby, with a balustrade overlooking the south end of the banking room.

Floors and furniture 
The floors are paved in multicolored marble. The nave is arranged in a grid of 33 Cosmati rectangles (eleven bays of squares from north to south and three bays from west to east). Three general designs are used in the marble floor.  Low parapets run between the nave and aisles, doubling as the tellers' counters. There are metal grilles with bulletproof glass above each counter, decorated with figures of animals and the zodiac. The tops of the tellers' grilles are crested; at regular intervals, the grilles contain finials with depictions of eagles. Originally, the banking room contained a circular information desk supported by multicolored columns. The new-accounts area at the southwestern corner and the officers' area to the north were shielded by screens. Additionally, there were two circular tables with glass tops and marble colonnettes.

Walls 
The lowest part of the banking room's walls is made of yellow marble and contains ventilation grilles with griffins flanking a lozenge. The rest of the walls are made of cast stone. The southern part of the west wall contains a fireplace with orange colonnettes and a decorative lintel. The west wall contains small arched windows at ground level facing Ashland Place, decorated with lions, centaurs, and various animals. Above are the massive arched windows.

To the south are three round arches from the lobby, supported by marble columns with sculptures depicting industry and commerce. Above is the ladies' lounge, which is designed to resemble an extension of the nave. The western and eastern walls of the lounge have ornate marble columns, which support lintels with round columns above. Opposite the ladies' lounge, on the north wall, is a mosaic artwork depicting the borough of Brooklyn. The work depicts the Williamsburgh Savings Bank surrounded by landmarks and motifs representing Brooklyn and its history. These include 17th-century explorer Henry Hudson's ship Half Moon; five historic towns that were later merged into Brooklyn; and the coats of arms of New Amsterdam, British New York, and the City of New York. It was installed by Ravenna Mosaics and is attributed to "Wagner" of Germany. The north and south walls also contain balustrades with analog clocks recessed into them.

Ceilings 
The aisles and nave are separated by four cast-stone piers, each consisting of a square shaft with semicircular columns protruding from each side. Each pier measures four stories high to its capital, while the diagonal steel beams behind each capital rise another story. The tops of these piers contain carved capitals; the carvings on the capitals depict elderly figures in retirement, representing "reasons to save". Round-arched openings span each aisle, connecting the pier with the nearest wall. Above these openings, taller arches with keystones rise to the ceiling.

The side aisles contain barrel-vaulted ceilings. Circular ventilation grilles are placed at the centers of the aisles' ceiling vaults, as well as above the officers' area to the north. The ceiling above the nave and above the banking room's north and south ends consists of cast-stone barrel vaults, outlined by square escutcheons and raised stone bands. The nave's ceiling vault also contains a blue-and-gold glass mosaic depicting an astrological motif. The mosaic, created by Angelo Magnanti, is placed on a steel mesh panel and is hung from the steel superstructure. A large chandelier with floral ornament and glass cylinder is suspended from the middle of the nave. Four smaller chandeliers of similar design are suspended above the aisles, and the ceiling of the ladies' lounge contains a circular ventilation grille and a chandelier.

Basement 
The basement lobby is a central space accessed from the eastern part of the ground-level lobby. The basement's lobby contains a terrazzo floor laid in a grid pattern. The walls are made of marble; the west wall contains a stairway up to the main elevator lobby. The plaster ceiling is a saucer vault containing a central chandelier with six arms. The basement lobby leads to the bank's vaults and the subway lobby.

There were three levels of basements for the bank's vaults. Originally, there were 10,000 drawers for depositors in the main vault. Three such doors existed in total. The steel doors were removed in the 2000s when the banking hall and basement were converted into a commercial space. The subway lobby has a plaster ceiling and revolving doors flanked by metal fences. Outside the subway lobby, a passageway connects directly with the LIRR's Atlantic Terminal and the subway. As part of a 2017 proposal to renovate the lower stories, an escalator was added between the basement and banking room.

Upper stories 
Immediately above the banking room were three levels of offices for the Williamsburgh Savings Bank, three in front of the banking room, and four behind it. These housed executive offices and bank transactions. The remainder of One Hanson Place originally contained rental office spaces. To maximize rental space, the architects spaced the superstructure's columns as far apart as possible. When the building was used as an office tower, the highest usable story was floor 29, right below the clock tower.

At the time of the Williamsburgh Savings Bank Tower's construction, the elevators in typical high-rise buildings were clustered around a central core. However, the ground-story banking room prevented the construction of a central core. The tower's elevators were instead placed at the southeast corner, connecting both to the office stories and to the LIRR/subway stations in the basement. Twelve elevators served the upper stories. One of these was a private elevator used by the Williamsburgh Savings Bank's president.

The units had a common room with a terrace, as well as a playroom and a shared business center. One example of a larger unit is a three-bedroom apartment on the 28th story with beamed ceilings, wooden floors, and nine windows on two elevations. Some of the penthouse units cover a full story, and there is also a duplex unit with a terrace leading out onto the former observation deck. The largest unit is unit 26A, a  penthouse on the 30th-story setback with four bedrooms. Jaklitsch/Gardner Architects redesigned the penthouse for its resident over eight years, combining some bedrooms and rearranging other spaces.

History 
The Williamsburgh Savings Bank was chartered in 1851. The bank was originally housed in the basement of a church at Bedford Avenue and South 3rd Street in Williamsburg; it had 158 depositors and $15,000 in assets. In 1854, it relocated to its own building across the street. In the aftermath of the American Civil War, the bank's holdings grew considerably, and the domed 175 Broadway headquarters was constructed from 1870 to 1875. Despite expansions in 1906 and 1923, the 175 Broadway headquarters was no longer sufficient for the bank's needs by the 1920s. The bank had 139,000 depositors and $212 million in assets in 1928, making it the fourth-largest in the U.S.

Each savings bank in New York had been limited to one location until 1923, when the state legislature passed a law allowing savings banks to construct branches. In March 1926, the Williamsburgh Savings Bank's Building Committee submitted an application to the New York superintendent of banks to build a branch in Crown Heights, Brooklyn. Three months later, the bank decided to instead build a headquarters near Downtown Brooklyn's transit hub. The 175 Broadway building was to be retained as a branch.

Development

During 1926, an anonymous buyer acquired lots on 1–9 Hanson Place and 135–149 Ashland Place in Downtown Brooklyn. This required a total of 29 transactions. After the Times-Union reported the buyer's identity as the Williamsburgh Savings Bank in October 1926, the bank announced it would open a new headquarters at the site. Upon hearing of the plans, the City Savings Bank and the Dime Savings Bank of New York, which operated branches in Downtown Brooklyn, expressed opposition and claimed the Williamsburgh Savings Bank was "invading" their territory. Though they were joined by six other banks, New York's superintendent of banks moved to allow the Williamsburgh to open a Downtown Brooklyn branch. The approval was contingent on the fact that a temporary branch, which was planned to open at Flatbush and Atlantic Avenues, would shut down when the permanent building was finished.

Bank officials considered several plans, including a bank without any office space. Ultimately, bank officials decided to construct a combination bank and office tower, which was originally planned to be 16 stories tall.  The William Kennedy Construction Company was awarded the general contract for the new building in December 1926, at which point the building was planned to cost $3 million. The Williamsburgh Savings Bank acquired land from the Hanson Place Church the same month, and a chimney for the church was integrated into the new bank building. In January 1927, the Williamsburgh Savings Bank opened a temporary location at Flatbush and Atlantic Avenues. Later that month, Halsey, McCormack and Helmer filed plans for the new edifice with the city's Bureau of Buildings. The department rejected the original plans, saying it violated the provisions of the 1916 Zoning Resolution. This pushed back the original 1928 completion date by up to six months.

At the time, the bank's holdings had just surpassed $200 million. The Williamsburgh Savings Bank Tower's cornerstone was laid on April 9, 1928, and the superstructure was topped out by the end of July 1928. Managing agent R. M. Dinsmore began renting out the space that year, and the clock atop the building started operating in December. The building's construction spurred the development of other buildings nearby even before it was completed. These included the Brooklyn Paramount Theater and several office buildings, as well as apartment buildings on Hanson Place.

Bank and office use

1920s to 1970s 
Four hundred people attended a reception for the new bank building on March 28, 1929. At the time, 75 percent of the space had been leased. The banking offices opened on April 1, and the building was 85 percent occupied by the time the office stories officially opened the next month. The office space was particularly popular among insurance companies, with four such firms having signed leases there by June. Despite the Wall Street Crash later that year, the Williamsburgh Savings Bank Tower was 94 percent occupied at the end of 1929. The new building helped increase the Williamsburgh Savings Bank's business; by the bank's 85th anniversary in 1936, there were 165,000 depositors from all U.S. states and many countries. Among the tenants who signed leases in the 1930s were the Bureau of Internal Revenue, the United Personal Loan Corporation, and Catholic newspaper The Tablet.

A life-insurance sales department opened at both of the Williamsburgh Savings Bank's branches in 1941. J. J. Roehrig of the Williamsburgh Savings Bank took over as the building's manager in 1943. During World War II, the building's manager instituted a policy in which only the first four floors would remain illuminated during citywide blackout orders. Toward the end of the war, in 1945, an office for discharged service members opened within the building. In the 1950s, the tower's tenants included architect Henry V. Murphy. As Brooklyn's tallest building, the tower was also used for displays; for example, during Good Friday, some rooms were lit so the pattern on the facade resembled a cross. The clock faces were cleaned extensively in 1957.  By the 1960s, the former ladies' lounge next to the banking room was converted into a mail room. The banking hall also hosted events such as an American Revolutionary War exhibit by the Long Island Historical Society in 1976. The observation deck on floor 26, which had been open to the public since the building opened, was shuttered in the late 1970s.

The New York City Landmarks Preservation Commission (LPC) designated the exterior of the building as a New York City landmark on November 15, 1977. One of the bank's vice presidents said: "We did not seek this landmark status but we're rather proud of our building." The designation then had to be approved by the New York City Board of Estimate, but this approval was held up when U.S. representative Fred Richmond accused the Williamsburgh Savings Bank of participating in redlining by refusing to give mortgages to residents of poorer neighborhoods. The Board of Estimate finally approved the landmark designation in March 1978, when the bank pledged to allocate $10 million for loans and mortgages to Brooklyn residents. The building was also eligible for listing on the National Register of Historic Places (NRHP) and could receive tax abatements if it were added to the NRHP. The LPC added the Williamsburgh Savings Bank Tower to the Brooklyn Academy of Music Historic District on September 26, 1978.

1980s to early 2000s 
By the 1980s, the Williamsburgh Savings Bank Tower contained many dentists' offices. The building also contained executive offices for the Green-Wood Cemetery, as well as the production offices of The Tablet and one story for data-processing equipment. The Williamsburgh started replacing windows in 1983 after finding that some were severely deteriorated. This move required approval from the LPC, but the bank did not request such approval, saying it did not want to delay the window replacement. The Republic National Bank acquired the Williamsburgh Savings Bank and its branches in 1986. Republic announced plans to renovate the lobby, banking room, mechanical systems, and facade in 1988, in advance of the building's 60th anniversary. The building was rebranded One Hanson Place during this time. The project was completed that September.

Following the completion of the renovation, an LPC staff member contacted the bank after reading news reports of the project. The staff member found that, while most of the work was confined to the interior (and thus did not require approval), 906 of the exterior windows had been replaced. The resulting replacement was the largest violation of New York City's landmarks law at the time. Instead of forcing Republic to uninstall all of the windows, the LPC ruled that the bank only needed to install muntins over the replacement windows. At the end of 1989, the Republic Savings Bank merged with the Manhattan Savings Bank. The building's name was not changed, and residents unofficially continued to call it the Williamsburgh Tower. By then, dentists occupied most of the building, with over 100 dentists taking up 70 percent of the office space; the dental office on floor 29 was the highest accessible point in Brooklyn. The New York Times said the building had "one attraction that even the World Trade Center and the Empire State Building can't match: as you inhale the scenery, you can get a root canal too."

The LPC hosted public hearings in June 1993 to determine whether to designate the Williamsburgh Savings Bank Tower's interior as a city landmark, along with that of three other banks in Brooklyn and two in Manhattan. The bank's interior was designated a New York City landmark on June 25, 1996. By 1999, Republic and its branches had been acquired by HSBC Bank USA. HSBC moved into the 7th through 11th floors, while the remaining space was 96 percent occupied by 2002. However, the relatively small dimensions of the tower were not attractive to larger tenants, which preferred more modern buildings with larger floor plates. Though many of the building's dentists moved away in the 1990s and 2000s, two dozen dentists remained in 2004.

Residential conversion

Sale and renovation 
In mid-2004, One Hanson Place's owner HSBC Bank USA placed the building for sale. One potential buyer wanted to operate the building as an office structure, but he reneged because he could not match the bids of residential developers, who were willing to pay much more. That November, the Dermot Company and Canyon Capital Realty Advisers agreed to buy the building for about $73 million. Basketball player Magic Johnson was also a partner in the sale, which was finalized in May 2005. After the sale, HSBC leased a bank branch at Atlantic Terminal, and the building's remaining dentists had to find new offices. The new owners planned to convert the building to stores and residential condominiums while preserving the facade and banking interior. H. Thomas O'Hara designed the renovation. One Hanson Place was one of several landmarked bank buildings in New York City that were either partially or fully converted into residential buildings during the 2000s.

The dentists had used large amounts of mercury vapor in their offices, and a third of the offices had higher levels of mercury vapor than was allowed for residences. Consequently, the mercury vapor also had to be removed. The clock faces were also temporarily disassembled for repairs, since they had become unsynchronized not only with the actual time but with each other. Johnson did not initially plan to include affordable housing in the converted building, prompting criticism from community groups.  Corcoran Group, which was hired to market the building, had planned to lease the banking room to a Borders bookstore in 2006 but was not successful in doing so.  In June 2006, the 179 residential condominiums were placed on sale for between $350,000 and $3.5 million each. The first residents finalized their purchases in 2007, and the clock was re-lit that November.

Post-conversion 

Seventy percent of the condominiums had been sold by January 2008. That month, the first residents moved into the building and the clock's hands started operating again. Residential sales peaked in early 2008 before stalling for about six months. Film producer CJ Follini and Noyack Medical Partners purchased the commercial section of the tower that May. The commercial owners held talks with Apple Inc. and Microsoft to open an Apple Store or a Microsoft Store in the space. However, it was hard to attract tenants to the banking room because the landmark status prevented extensive modifications. Furthermore, the commercial owners wanted to wait for a suitable tenant such as a "museum store" that would preserve the banking hall.

Events venue Skylight One Hanson agreed to operate the banking room in July 2009. Skylight One Hanson opened that September, renting the banking room for events for at least $15,000 per night. The venue was used by such events as VH1 Divas and MTV's Hip Hop Honors. That December, the banking room also started hosting flea market Brooklyn Flea during weekends. Though the building's apartments were heavily marketed, some units remained unsold, leading the developers to reduce prices several times. By 2011, all units except for six penthouses had been sold. The six penthouse units were auctioned that May at a significant discount from their original prices. The clock was repaired again and relit in 2013. In June 2015, Madison Realty Capital bought One Hanson Place's  retail condominium, including the banking room, for $20.4 million, Madison Realty intended to convert the space into a flagship store.

In 2017, the LPC approved a proposal by Higgins Quasebarth & Partners and Acheson Doyle Partners Architects to modify the banking room. The changes largely consisted of circulation improvements, including removing parts of tellers' desks. At the end of that year, Madison Realty hired Chris DeCrosta to market the space. Further alterations to the banking room's furniture were approved in 2019. From December 2021 to February 2022, Skylight One Hanson hosted a pop-up attraction themed to Netflix's adaptation of the TV series Money Heist.

Impact

Architectural commentary 
Reviews of the building's architecture were generally positive. A New York Times writer characterized the building in 1972 as "possibly America's funniest skyscraper", considering that its interior "resembles a movie set for an impossibly opulent version of The Last of the Borgias". Christopher Gray of the Times wrote: "The main lobby and banking area are elegant, affecting the grand style designed to make every depositor feel like a millionaire." In a book about Brooklyn's buildings, historian Francis Morrone described One Hanson Place as "one of the five to ten greatest skyscrapers in New York City", saying that it even surpassed Halsey, McCormack and Helmer's design for the neighboring Hanson Place Church.

Some observers compared the massing to a phallus. For instance, the 2010 edition of the AIA Guide to New York City called the dome "New York's most exuberant phallic symbol". Author Jonathan Ames created a "Most Phallic Building" contest following an article he wrote for Slate magazine, in which he claimed that the tower was the most phallic building he had ever seen.

Symbolism and height record 

Upon the Williamsburgh Savings Bank Tower's groundbreaking, the New York Daily News said the tower would be "the pioneer skyscraper of unusual beauty in this vicinity", while the Brooklyn Times-Union stated: "Our skyline and that of Manhattan are merging". When the tower was completed, the Brooklyn Citizen said: "This awe-inspiring structure is more than a monument to the bank whose name it bears; it is the tangible evidence of the fact that the LIRR station area is soon to become as fine a commercial center as the district further down town around Borough Hall." Within a year of completion, the Brooklyn Daily Eagle said the tower had led to the establishment of a business hub around the LIRR terminal.

The tower had been intended as the first of a series of skyscrapers near Downtown Brooklyn. In the decade prior to One Hanson Place's completion, four buildings had held the record of Brooklyn's tallest building. Eric Nash wrote in 2005 that the building "was meant to put Brooklyn on the map as a rival to Manhattan in terms of both architecture and finance". The onset of the Great Depression had led to the cancellation of other high-rise projects nearby. Despite this, Paul Goldberger wrote for the Times in 1988: "The cityscape has never suffered from this tower's isolated position." As late as 2001, the Times called One Hanson Place one of "the only instantly recognizable elements of the fragmentary Brooklyn skyline". It was only in the 2010s that several new skyscrapers in Brooklyn exceeded One Hanson Place's height; accordingly, several buildings held the record for Brooklyn's tallest building.

The building remained an icon of Brooklyn through the late 20th century; for example, a 1983 article for the Daily News described the Williamsburgh Savings Bank and its tower as one symbol of "who really runs Brooklyn". The high concentration of dentists as tenants led the New York Daily News to call the building "the mecca of dentistry" in the 2000s. The New York Observer said in 2006: "To call the Williamsburgh Savings Bank building iconic is hardly to the point. It is possibly the only skyline landmark in the borough, besides the Brooklyn Bridge..." The tower has also been used as a filming location, including for the film Prizzi's Honor, the TV series Gotham, and the film Going in Style.

See also

 List of New York City Designated Landmarks in Brooklyn
 List of tallest buildings in New York City

References

Notes

Citations

Sources

External links

 
 Official website (retail)
 Williamsburgh Savings Bank Building photographs and architectural drawings, Brooklyn Public Library

1929 establishments in New York City
Bank buildings in New York City
Clock towers in New York City
Commercial buildings completed in 1929
Commercial buildings in Brooklyn
Downtown Brooklyn
Fort Greene, Brooklyn
New York City Designated Landmarks in Brooklyn
New York City interior landmarks
Office buildings completed in 1929
Office buildings in New York City
Residential buildings in Brooklyn
Residential condominiums in New York City
Residential skyscrapers in New York City
Romanesque Revival architecture in New York City
Skyscrapers in Brooklyn